Hyphodontiastra is a fungal genus in the family Meruliaceae. It is a monotypic genus containing the single species Hyphodontiastra virgicola, a crust fungus found in Brazil.

References

Taxa described in 1999
Fungi of South America
Meruliaceae
Monotypic Polyporales genera